Salvatore Gambino (born 27 November 1983) is an Italian-German former professional footballer who played as a midfielder, but could play as a striker as well.

Career
Having joined Borussia Dortmund in 1996, Gambino played in the club's youth teams before being promoted to the reserve team. In the 2003–04 season he had 20 Bundesliga appearances with the first team. Struggling with injuries, Gambino managed ten league games in the 2004–05 season.

In summer 2006, Gambino transferred to 1. FC Köln. Two years later, in June 2008, he joined TuS Koblenz where he was released on 24 June 2009.

He signed for then-fourth tier Italian club Trapani in January 2011 playing only ten games with no goals. He was featured more regularly throughout the 2011–12 season, now in Lega Pro Prima Divisione appearing in 32 games and scoring nine goals.

In October 2015, Gambino signed with German fifth-tier club Westfalia Rhynern.

He retired at the end of the 2019–20 season.

References

External links
 

1983 births
Living people
German people of Sicilian descent
Sportspeople from Hagen
German footballers
Footballers from North Rhine-Westphalia
Association football midfielders
Association football forwards
Bundesliga players
2. Bundesliga players
Serie B players
Serie C players
Borussia Dortmund players
Borussia Dortmund II players
1. FC Köln players
TuS Koblenz players
Trapani Calcio players
A.S. Gubbio 1910 players
F.C. Grosseto S.S.D. players